Helena, Helen, Elena or Jelena of Bulgaria may refer to:

 Helena, Empress of Bulgaria, second wife of Bulgarian Emperor Ivan Asen I (d. 1196)
 Helena Asenina of Bulgaria, Empress consort of Byzantium; Theodore II Laskaris (1254–1258)
 Helena of Bulgaria, Empress of Serbia, Empress consort of Serbia; Stefan Uroš IV Dušan (1331–1355)

See also
 Helena of Serbia (disambiguation)